Milczany  is a village in the administrative district of Gmina Samborzec, within Sandomierz County, Świętokrzyskie Voivodeship, in south-central Poland.

The village has a population of 456.

Milczany is located on the Lesser Polish Way, one of the Polish routes of the Way of St. James.

References

Villages in Sandomierz County